Mehtab may refer to:

 Mehtab (actress), Indian actress
 Mehtab Kadınefendi, wife Sultan Abdülmecid I
 Mehtab Bagh, charbagh complex in Agra, North India
 Mehtab Abbasi, Pakistani politician